Fabrice Fernandes (born 29 October 1979 in Aubervilliers) is a French former footballer who played for several clubs, most particularly Southampton.

Playing career
He first joined an English team in 2000, after signing a season-long loan deal at Fulham where he helped them get promoted to the Premier League. He played for the France national under-21 football team, impressing the likes of Rangers in the process, for whom he joined on loan in March 2001, scoring on his debut for the club, from 20 yards out against Motherwell.

In December 2001, he moved to Southampton, making his debut in a defeat to Leeds United, and played in many games during the season, despite sometimes being hit with injury. He picked up an FA Cup runners-up medal in season 2002–03, and had a solid 2003–04, at the end of which he was offered a new contract to run to 2006.

However, after Southampton were relegated to the Championship under manager Harry Redknapp  at the end of the 2004–05 season, Fernandes negotiated for release from his contract. The Saints needed to reduce their payroll and engaged the services of agent Willie McKay to find a new club for him. Allegedly, McKay was paid a fee of £30,000 by Southampton for his services. This transfer was amongst those being scrutinised by the Stevens enquiry into corruption in English football.

Sam Allardyce snapped him up for free at the end of August 2005 and he made his debut for Bolton in their first ever UEFA Cup game against Lokomotiv Plovdiv at the Reebok Stadium. He appeared once in the league for Bolton, as a substitute in a 5–1 defeat to Chelsea.

In February 2006 Fernandes moved to play in Israel for Beitar Jerusalem, the club owned by Arcadi Gaydamak, the father of Portsmouth owner Alexandre Gaydamak. After leaving the Jerusalem club he has had trial spells with Stoke City and Dunfermline Athletic.

In January 2007, he joined Dinamo Bucharest (Romania) in the Romanian First League, but was released a year later. From there he joined Le Havre.

Honours
Fulham
Football League First Division champions: 2000–01

Beitar Jerusalem
 Israeli Premier League champions: 2006–07

Southampton
 FA Cup runners-up: 2003

Dinamo Bucuresti
 Liga I champions: 2006–07
 Romanian Supercup runners-up: 2007

References

External links

1979 births
Living people
French people of Portuguese descent
French footballers
Stade Rennais F.C. players
Bolton Wanderers F.C. players
Southampton F.C. players
Olympique de Marseille players
Rangers F.C. players
Fulham F.C. players
Beitar Jerusalem F.C. players
Expatriate footballers in Israel
FC Dinamo București players
Le Havre AC players
French expatriate sportspeople in Israel
Premier League players
Ligue 1 players
Scottish Premier League players
French expatriate footballers
Expatriate footballers in Scotland
French expatriate sportspeople in Romania
Expatriate footballers in Romania
Liga I players
Expatriate footballers in England
French expatriate sportspeople in England
Association football wingers
FA Cup Final players